RE1-Silencing Transcription factor (REST), also known as Neuron-Restrictive Silencer Factor (NRSF), is a protein which in humans is encoded by the REST  gene, and acts as a transcriptional repressor. REST is expressly involved in the repression of neural genes in non-neuronal cells. Many genetic disorders have been tied to alterations in the REST expression pattern, including colon and small-cell lung carcinomas found with truncated versions of REST. In addition to these cancers, defects in REST have also been attributed a role in Huntington Disease, neuroblastomas, and the effects of epileptic seizures and ischemia.

Function 

This gene encodes a transcriptional repressor which represses neuronal genes in non-neuronal tissues. It is a member of the Kruppel-type zinc finger transcription factor family. It represses transcription by binding a DNA sequence element called the neuron-restrictive silencer element (NRSE, also known as RE1). The protein is also found in undifferentiated neuronal progenitor cells, and it is thought that this repressor may act as a master negative regulator of neurogenesis. Alternatively spliced transcript variants have been described; however, their full length nature has not been determined. REST is found to be down-regulated in elderly people with Alzheimer's disease.

REST contains 8 Cys2His2 zinc fingers and mediates gene repression by recruiting several chromatin-modifying enzymes.

REST expression strongly correlates with increased longevity. REST levels are highest in the brains of people who lived up to be 90 - 100s and remained cognitively intact. Levels stayed high specifically in the brain regions vulnerable to Alzheimer's, suggesting that they might be protected from dementia. It is assumed that REST represses genes that promote cell death and Alzheimer's disease pathology, and induces the expression of stress response genes. Moreover, REST potently protects neurons from oxidative stress and amyloid β-protein toxicity. REST is also responsible for ischaemia induced neuronal cell death, in mouse models of  brain ischaemia. Ischaemia, which results from reduced blood perfusion of tissues, decreasing nutrient and oxygen supply, induces REST transcription and nuclear accumulation, leading to the epigenetic repression of neuronal genes leading to cell death. The mechanism beyond REST induction in ischaemia, might be tightly linked to its oxygen-dependent nuclear translocation and repression of target genes in hypoxia (low oxygen) where REST fulfils the functions of a master regulator of gene repression in hypoxia.

Interactions 

RE1-silencing transcription factor has been shown to interact with RCOR1.

References

Further reading

External links 
 
 

Transcription factors